Huang Kuo-shu (born 3 January 1964) is a Taiwanese politician.

Education
Huang attended National Taichung First Senior High School and Taipei National University of the Arts before earning a master's degree from National Chung Hsing University.

Political career
Huang served on the Taichung City Council from 1998 to 2015, when he was elected to the Legislative Yuan after winning a by-election against Hsiao Chia-chi. Since taking his seat in the legislature, Huang has researched safety standards for young children and participated in discussions about education. He was named a convenor of the Legislative Yuan's Education and Culture Committee in March 2016, alongside Apollo Chen. From this position, Huang has opposed the proposed merger of Tainan National University of the Arts with National Cheng Kung University, stating that such a move was a "top-down effort" to "kill TNNUA’s founding spirit." He has supported attempts to remove military instructors from educational institutions in Taiwan. During his legislative tenure, Huang has worked to uncover improprieties in many governmental agencies and programs. Huang has frequently been critical of organizations providing oversight of sports in Taiwan.

On 16 October 2021, the Liberty Times reported that Huang had served as an informant for the Kuomintang one-party state during Taiwan's martial law period. Huang subsequently confirmed the news report on Facebook, acknowledging that he had agreed to provide an intelligence unit with information on friends affiliated with the political opposition during his 20s, while he was attending university. Huang additionally stated that he would complete his legislative term, withdraw from the Democratic Progressive Party, and vowed not to run for office in the 2024 legislative election.

References

1964 births
Living people
Taipei National University of the Arts alumni
National Chung Hsing University alumni
Taichung Members of the Legislative Yuan
Members of the 8th Legislative Yuan
Members of the 9th Legislative Yuan
Politicians of the Republic of China on Taiwan from Nantou County
Democratic Progressive Party Members of the Legislative Yuan
Members of the 10th Legislative Yuan
20th-century Taiwanese politicians
Taichung City Councilors